The 2019–20 season is Atlético Tucumán's fifth consecutive season in the top division of Argentine football. In addition to the Primera División, the club are competing in the Copa Argentina, Copa de la Superliga and Copa Sudamericana.

The season generally covers the period from 1 July 2019 to 30 June 2020.

Review

Pre-season
Cristian Erbes was announced as Atlético Tucumán's first off-season signing on 17 June 2019, as he agreed terms on a move from Nacional of the Paraguayan Primera División. He was followed on the same day by Fabián Monzón, who had been a free agent since leaving Universidad de Chile in mid-2018. José Luis Fernández (Defensa y Justicia) and Dylan Gissi (Patronato) also completed moves in on that day. Mathías Abero departed to Patronato on 19 June, with Juan Cruz Kaprof following him out as he joined Arsenal de Sarandí on 21 June. Their fifth reinforcement became Federico Bravo on 25 June, joining from Patronato. Rodrigo Aliendro was confirmed as their third outgoing player on 27 June, as the central midfielder moved to fellow Primera División outfit Colón.

Later on 27 June, a swap deal with Racing Club was made official as David Barbona switched places with Augusto Lotti and Yonathan Cabral; with Racing also paying $750k. Lotti penned a five-year contract, while Cabral made his loan permanent to sign a four-year deal. Ricardo Zielinski secured his eighth new player on 28 June by completing negotiations with Colón's Gustavo Toledo, which was later revealed to have been part of swap for Rodrigo Aliendro. Numerous loans from the previously campaign expired on 30 June. Franco Sbuttoni made a move to Arsenal de Sarandí on 1 July, while Juan Mercier went to San Martín in the following twenty-four hours. Leonardo Heredia signed on 3 July, coming from Plaza Colonia of the Uruguayan Primera División.

Marcelo Ortiz arrived from Boca Unidos on 6 July, as Claudio Pombo went to Sarmiento. They met Gimnasia y Esgrima (J) went undefeated in two matches on 11 July. On 12 July, Deportes Antofagasta captured Nery Leyes. They suffered losses on 16 July against Vélez Sarsfield. Mauro Osores was loaned by Primera B Nacional's Guillermo Brown on 19 July. Tucumán played Boca Juniors in consecutive friendlies on 18 July, losing by an aggregate of six goals. They again went winless in games with Banfield on 20 July. Ariel Rojas, from San Lorenzo, came on 22 July. Guillermo Acosta, after terminating his contract with Lanús, headed to Tucumán on 25 July; seven months after doing the opposite. Lucas Melano joined on 26 July, having left Portland Timbers on 16 July.

July
Atlético Tucumán hosted Rosario Central on day one of the 2019–20 Primera División, eventually falling to a 1–2 defeat after Leonardo Gil scored the visitor's winner. Gonzalo Castellani signed for Tucumán from San Lorenzo on 30 July. Gervasio Núñez headed off to newly-promoted Central Córdoba on 31 July.

August
Atlético Tucumán experienced consecutive defeats in the Primera División on 3 August, as Central Córdoba beat them at the Estadio Alfredo Terrera. Tucumán met Mitre in two friendlies on 8 August, as they both ended with one-goal wins; Gonzalo Castellani and Jonás Romero scored. After back-to-back games without a win to start the league campaign, Tucumán won their first three points on 19 August during a fixture with Godoy Cruz. A third loss in four matches arrived for Ricardo Zielinski's men on 26 August, as they lost 3–0 away to Aldosivi. José San Román departed to Cypriot football with Nea Salamina on 31 August.

September
Marcelo Ortiz netted in the Primera División against Arsenal de Sarandí on 1 September, which gave Tucumán their second straight home victory on 1 September. Tucumán went through to the round of sixteen in the Copa Argentina on 4 September, defeating Boca Unidos on penalties in the round of thirty-two.

Squad

Transfers
Domestic transfer windows:3 July 2019 to 24 September 201920 January 2020 to 19 February 2020.

Transfers in

Transfers out

Loans in

Loans out

Friendlies

Pre-season
Banfield revealed, on 19 June, a friendly match with Atlético Tucumán was to take place in pre-season. Further fixtures, against Vélez Sarsfield and Defensa y Justicia, were released by the club on 24 June. A match with San Salvador de Jujuy's Gimnasia y Esgrima was scheduled on 4 July. Exact details for the Vélez Sarsfield and Banfield games were communicated on 8 July, as an encounter with Boca Juniors was also added; with all matches taking place in Buenos Aires.

Mid-season
Mitre announced friendlies with Atlético Tucumán on 6 August.

Competitions

Primera División

League table

Relegation table

Source: AFA

Results summary

Matches
The fixtures for the 2019–20 campaign were released on 10 July.

Copa Argentina

Atlético Tucumán were drawn to face Boca Unidos (Torneo Federal A) in the Copa Argentina round of thirty-two, with the match set for the Estadio Padre Ernesto Martearena in Salta. After progressing, they'd met league rivals Colón.

Copa de la Superliga

Copa Sudamericana

Squad statistics

Appearances and goals

Statistics accurate as of 5 September 2019.

Goalscorers

Notes

References

Atlético Tucumán seasons
Atlético Tucumán